Jacco Eltingh and Paul Haarhuis were the defending champions and successfully defended their title, winning in the final 6–2, 7–6, against Rick Leach and Jonathan Stark.

Seeds
All seeds receive a bye into the second round.

Draw

Finals

Top half

Bottom half

External links
 1997 Paris Open Doubles draw

1997 Paris Open
1997 ATP Tour